Benji Russell Radach (born April 5, 1979) is an American professional mixed martial artist currently competing in the middleweight division of Bellator MMA. A professional competitor since 2001, Radach has also formerly competed for the UFC, the WEC, Strikeforce, and the Los Angeles Anacondas of the IFL.

Mixed martial arts

Early career
Radach made his professional MMA debut in 2001 and compiled an undefeated record of 10-0 before being signed by the UFC to compete as a Welterweight.

Ultimate Fighting Championship
Radach made his UFC debut against Steve Berger at UFC 37 on May 10, 2002. Radach originally was declared the winner via TKO 27 seconds into the first round, but the decision was later overturned when replay showed that Radach had the fence in his hand as he finished the final blows that ended the fight via TKO.

Radach next fought against Nick Serra on June 22, 2002, at UFC 37.5. Radach won via unanimous decision.

Radach then made his next appearance against future UFC Lightweight Champion Sean Sherk at UFC 39 on September 27, 2002. Radach lost in the first round via TKO from a referee stoppage due to a cut.

Post-UFC
Radach returned to the regional circuit where he went 4-1 before facing former WEC Middleweight Champion Chris Leben under the SportFight 4 on June 26, 2004. Radach lost via TKO in the third round after breaking his jaw, and as a result, he was kept away from active competition for three years.

International Fight League
Radach returned to MMA in 2007 after signing a contract to compete for the Los Angeles Anacondas of the IFL, coached by Bas Rutten. He made his first appearance against Ryan McGivern on February 2, 2007, at IFL: Houston. Radach won via TKO in the second round.

Radach then faced Brian Foster at IFL: Los Angeles on March 17, 2007. Radach won via guillotine choke submission in the first round.

Radach then fought Bristol Marunde at IFL: Everett on June 1, 2007, and won via TKO in the first round.

Radach made his next appearance against Gerald Harris at the IFL 2007 semifinals on August 2, 2007. Radach won via TKO in the first round.

Radach next fought Brent Beauparlant at the IFL World Grand Prix Semifinals on November 3, 2007, and won via knockout in the first round.

Undefeated in the promotion, he next fought for the inaugural IFL Middleweight Championship against Matt Horwich at the IFL World Grand Prix Finals on December 29, 2007. Radach lost via knockout in the second round.

EliteXC
Radach signed a three-fight deal with EliteXC in 2008 and won his first bout against top-ranked middleweight Murilo Rua at EliteXC: Heat on October 4, 2008. He finished the fight via TKO in the second round.

Strikeforce
After EliteXC's demise, Radach then moved on to Strikeforce where he lost by a controversial knockout to Scott Smith. He was winning the fight striking until he was knocked out by a straight right from Smith in the final round.

Radach has suffered many injuries throughout his career, including a broken jaw, a herniated disc, neck surgery, ACL replacement, and a broken collarbone, amongst others. Radach would suffer another problem in February 2010 when he caught a staph infection after surgery on a torn pectoral muscle that was suffered in training.

Radach fought Ovince St. Preux for Strikeforce on December 4, 2010. Radach lost to St. Preux via unanimous decision (30-27, 30-26, 30-25).

Radach was expected to return from a three-year hiatus and face Dmitry Samoilov at Tyumen Fight 2 on December 22, 2013. However, in the weeks leading up to the fight, the event was cancelled.

Bellator MMA
Over four years after his last fight, Radach made his Bellator debut against undefeated Ben Reiter at Bellator 137 on May 15, 2015, replacing an injured A.J. Matthews. He lost the fight by unanimous decision.

Outside MMA
Radach has been a 4-year 01 journeyman electrician since he was 23 and worked as a chaser in the woods logging and also commercial fishing in Petersburg, Alaska and Brystol Bay Alaska to pay for school and MMA training.

In 2006 Radach foiled an armed robbery attempt in Vancouver, Washington, by physically disarming a gunman who was trying to hold up the restaurant that Radach was patronizing.

In 2008, he was named the corporate director of instructor's training for LA Boxing. His responsibilities primarily involve training and preparing potential LA Boxing instructors for lessons of various experience levels.

Mixed martial arts record

|-
|Loss
|align=center| 21–7 (1)
|Ben Reiter
|Decision (unanimous)
|Bellator 137
|
|align=center|3
|align=center|5:00
|Temecula, California, United States
| 
|-
| Loss
| align=center| 21–6 (1)
| Ovince St. Preux
| Decision (unanimous)
| Strikeforce: Henderson vs. Babalu II
| 
| align=center| 3
| align=center| 5:00
| St. Louis, Missouri, United States
| 
|-
| Loss
| align=center| 21–5 (1)
| Scott Smith
| KO (punch)
| Strikeforce: Shamrock vs. Diaz
| 
| align=center| 3
| align=center| 3:24
| San Jose, California, United States
| 
|-
| Win
| align=center| 21–4 (1)
| Murilo Rua
| TKO (punches)
| EliteXC: Heat
| 
| align=center| 2
| align=center| 2:31
| Sunrise, Florida, United States
| 
|-
| Loss
| align=center| 20–4 (1)
| Matt Horwich
| KO (punch)
| IFL: World Grand Prix Finals
| 
| align=center| 2
| align=center| 1:58
| Uncasville, Connecticut, United States
| 
|-
| Win
| align=center| 20–3 (1)
| Brent Beauparlant
| KO (punch)
| IFL: World Grand Prix Semifinals
| 
| align=center| 1
| align=center| 2:26
| Chicago, Illinois, United States
| 
|-
| Win
| align=center| 19–3 (1)
| Gerald Harris
| TKO (punches)
| IFL: 2007 Semifinals
| 
| align=center| 1
| align=center| 3:03
| East Rutherford, New Jersey, United States
| 
|-
| Win
| align=center| 18–3 (1)
| Bristol Marunde
| TKO (punches)
| IFL: Everett
| 
| align=center| 1
| align=center| 1:28
| Everett, Washington, United States
| 
|-
| Win
| align=center| 17–3 (1)
| Brian Foster
| Submission (guillotine choke)
| IFL: Los Angeles
| 
| align=center| 1
| align=center| 1:04
| Los Angeles, California, United States
| 
|-
| Win
| align=center| 16–3 (1)
| Ryan McGivern
| TKO (punches)
| IFL: Houston
| 
| align=center| 2
| align=center| 2:22
| Houston, Texas, United States
| 
|-
| Loss
| align=center| 15–3 (1)
| Chris Leben
| TKO (jaw injury)
| SF 4: Fight For Freedom
| 
| align=center| 3
| align=center| 3:43
| Gresham, Oregon, United States
| 
|-
| Loss
| align=center| 15–2 (1)
| Danny Lafever
| KO (punch)
| Ultimate Ring Challenge 6
| 
| align=center| 1
| align=center| 0:55
| Longview, Washington, United States
| 
|-
| Win
| align=center| 15–1 (1)
| Gustavo Machado
| KO (punches)
| KOTC 28: More Punishment
| 
| align=center| 1
| align=center| 1:31
| Reno, Nevada, United States
| 
|-
| Win
| align=center| 14–1 (1)
| Steve Van Fleet
| KO (punches)
| IFC WC 18: Big Valley Brawl
| 
| align=center| 1
| align=center| 1:21
| Lakeport, California, United States
| 
|-
| Win
| align=center| 13–1 (1)
| Joel Blanton
| KO (punches)
| UFCF: Seattle
| 
| align=center| 1
| align=center| N/A
| Seattle, Washington, United States
| 
|-
| Win
| align=center| 12–1 (1)
| Chris Irvine
| KO (punches)
| Ultimate Ring Challenge 3
| 
| align=center| 1
| align=center| 1:02
| Kelso, Washington, United States
| 
|-
| Loss
| align=center| 11–1 (1)
| Sean Sherk
| TKO (cut)
| UFC 39
| 
| align=center| 1
| align=center| 4:16
| Uncasville, Connecticut, United States
|
|-
| Win
| align=center| 11–0 (1)
| Nick Serra
| Decision (unanimous)
| UFC 37.5
| 
| align=center| 3
| align=center| 5:00
| Las Vegas, Nevada, United States
| 
|-
| NC
| align=center| 10–0 (1)
| Steve Berger
| No Contest (overturned by state commission)
| UFC 37
| 
| align=center| 1
| align=center| 0:27
| Bossier City, Louisiana, United States
| 
|-
| Win
| align=center| 10–0
| Shannon Ritch
| TKO (punches)
| MFC 3: Canadian Pride
| 
| align=center| 1
| align=center| 1:18
| Alberta, Canada
| 
|-
| Win
| align=center| 9–0
| Eric Davila
| Decision (unanimous)
| Rumble in the Rockies
| 
| align=center| 2
| align=center| 3:00
| Denver, Colorado, United States
| 
|-
| Win
| align=center| 8–0
| Oscar Verdusco
| KO (punch)
| UFCF: Olympia Ring Challenge
| 
| align=center| 1
| align=center| 0:25
| Olympia, Washington, United States
| 
|-
| Win
| align=center| 7–0
| Willy Solorio
| TKO (punches)
| IFC: Warriors Challenge 16
| 
| align=center| 1
| align=center| 1:23
| Oroville, California, United States
| 
|-
| Win
| align=center| 6–0
| Royden Demotta
| TKO (punches and knees)
| WEC 2
| 
| align=center| 1
| align=center| 1:01
| Lemoore, California, United States
| 
|-
| Win
| align=center| 5–0
| Eric Perez
| KO (punch)
| PPKA: Muckelshoot
| 
| align=center| 1
| align=center| 0:18
| Auburn, Washington, United States
| 
|-
| Win
| align=center| 4–0
| Dennis Asche
| Decision (unanimous)
| DesertBrawl 1
| 
| align=center| 3
| align=center| 5:00
| Bend, Oregon, United States
| 
|-
| Win
| align=center| 3–0
| Oz Preciado
| KO (punch)
| UFCF: Everett Extreme Challenge 3
| 
| align=center| 1
| align=center| N/A
| Everett, Washington, United States
| 
|-
| Win
| align=center| 2–0
| Eric Lucas
| KO (punch)
| Rumble in the Ring 2
| 
| align=center| 1
| align=center| 0:09
| Auburn, Washington, United States
| 
|-
| Win
| align=center| 1–0
| Clayton Purvis
| TKO (punches)
| UFCF: Road To Victory
| 
| align=center| 3
| align=center| N/A
| Olympia, Washington, United States
|

References

External links
 
 Archived UFC Profile
 Benji Radach IFL Page
 Washington State Wrestling Championships 1997
 Washington State Wrestling Championships 1996

American male mixed martial artists
1979 births
Living people
Light heavyweight mixed martial artists
Middleweight mixed martial artists
Welterweight mixed martial artists
Sportspeople from Washington (state)
People from Castle Rock, Washington
Ultimate Fighting Championship male fighters